The Gwa'sala are one of the main groups of the Kwakwaka'wakw peoples, now joined with the 'Nak'waxda'xw (Nakoaktok) in the Gwa'sala-'Nakwaxda'xw Nations band government.  Their traditional home and still-territory is around Smith Sound and Smith Inlet, while that of the 'Nakwaxda'xw is at Blunden Harbour farther south on the north side of Queen Charlotte Strait.

References

Kwakwaka'wakw
First Nations in British Columbia